Rudolf Schoenert (27 July 1911 – 30 November 1985) was the seventh highest scoring night fighter flying ace in the German Luftwaffe during World War II. He was also a recipient of the Knight's Cross of the Iron Cross with Oak Leaves. The Knight's Cross of the Iron Cross and its higher grade Oak Leaves was awarded to recognise extreme battlefield bravery or successful military leadership.

Early life and career
Schoenert was born on 27 July 1911 in Glogau in the Province of Silesia, a province of the German Kingdom of Prussia, today it is Głogów in Poland. On 22 May 1933, he started flight training as a civil pilot with the Deutsche Verkehrsfliegerschule (German Air Transport School) in Braunschweig. From 4 December 1936 to 26 February 1937, he received his recruit training. On 1 April 1937, Schoenert started working as a civil flight instructor.

World War II
After five years in the Merchant Navy, Schoenert began flight training in 1933 and went on to fly commercial aircraft for Lufthansa. He was commissioned as a Leutnant in the Luftwaffe's Reserve in 1938.

Night fighter career

Following the 1939 aerial Battle of the Heligoland Bight, Royal Air Force (RAF) attacks shifted to the cover of darkness, initiating the Defence of the Reich campaign. By mid-1940, Generalmajor (Brigadier General) Josef Kammhuber had established a night air defense system dubbed the Kammhuber Line. It consisted of a series of control sectors equipped with radars and searchlights and an associated night fighter. Each sector named a Himmelbett (canopy bed) would direct the night fighter into visual range with target bombers. In 1941, the Luftwaffe started equipping night fighters with airborne radar such as the Lichtenstein radar. This airborne radar did not come into general use until early 1942.

In June 1941, Schoenert joined 4./Nachtjagdgeschwader 1 (NJG 1—1st Night Fighter Wing) at Bergen in northern Holland. His total stood at 22 by 25 July 1942 and he was awarded the Knight's Cross of the Iron Cross.

Schoenert is recognized as the instigator of upward-firing armament in German night fighter force. The concept, dubbed Schräge Musik (Jazz Music) was first suggested by him in 1941. Kammhuber initially rejected the idea based on reports filed by Helmut Lent and Werner Streib. Following the Knight's Cross presentation, Schoenert again petitioned the idea to Kammhuber who approved the installation of upward-firing armament in three Dornier Do 217J, one of which issued to Schoenert.

Group commander
On 1 December 1942, Schoenert was made Gruppenkommandeur (group commander) of the newly formed II. Gruppe of Nachtjagdgeschwader 5 (NJG 5—5th Night Fighter Wing). The Gruppe was equipped with Messerschmitt Bf 110 heavy fighter. Schoenert brought to the Gruppe his modified Do 217 fighter which was inspected by Oberfeldwebel Paul Mahle, an armorer attached to II. Gruppe. Mahle analyzed the concept and installed upward-firing guns into the cockpit of two Bf 110 night fighters.

Schoenert claimed the first aerial victory with Schräge Musik in May 1943.

On 5 August 1943, Schoenert was appointed Gruppenkommandeur of I. Gruppe of Nachtjagdgeschwader 100 (NJG 100—100th Night Fighter Wing), replacing Hauptmann Heinrich Prinz zu Sayn-Wittgenstein who was transferred. NJG 100 was operating on the Eastern Front, where he claimed to have shot down 30 Soviet aircraft by early 1944. While there, he utilised a Junkers Ju 87D-5 "Stuka" dive-bomber with the configuration in an effort to target the slow-flying Soviet biplane fighter-bombers. On 1 January 1944, Schoenert was appointed commander of Nachtjagdgruppe 10 (NJGr 10—10th Night Fighter Group) and transferred command of I. Gruppe of NJG 100 to Major Alois Lechner.

On 11 April 1944, Schoenert was awarded the Knight's Cross of the Iron Cross with Oak Leaves, the 450th soldier to receive this distinction. The presentation was made by Adolf Hitler at the Berghof, Hitler's residence in the Obersalzberg of the Bavarian Alps, on 5 May 1944. Also present at the ceremony were Anton Hafner, Otto Kittel, Günther Schack, Emil Lang, Alfred Grislawski, Erich Rudorffer, Martin Möbus, Hans-Karl Stepp, Wilhelm Herget, Günther Radusch, Otto Pollmann and Fritz Breithaupt, who all received the Oak Leaves on this date.

On 15 November, Schoenert and Leutnant Karl Schnörrer, Oberst Gordon Gollob, Major Georg Christl, Hauptmann Heinz Strüning, Major Josef Fözö formed the guard of honor at Walter Nowotny funeral at the Zentralfriedhof in Vienna. Nowotny had been killed in action on 8 November 1944. The eulogy was delivered by Generaloberst Otto Deßloch.

On 6 March 1945, Schoenert succeeded Oberstleutnant Walter Borchers as Geschwaderkommodore (wing commander) of NJG 5. During a sortie east of the Elbe on 27 April 1945, an electrical fault rendered Schonert's radar unserviceable and his Junkers Ju 88G was shot down by a Royal Air Force (RAF) de Havilland Mosquito. He survived and was rescued by German troops.

Schoenert survived the war. Schoenert's radio and wireless operator was usually Oberfeldwebel Johannes Richter.

Summary of career

Aerial victory claims
According to US historian David T. Zabecki, Schoenert was credited with 64 aerial victories. Obermaier lists Schoenert with 65 aerial victories claimed in 376 combat missions, including 35 Soviet aircraft on the Eastern Front. Foreman, Parry and Mathews, authors of Luftwaffe Night Fighter Claims 1939 – 1945, researched the German Federal Archives and found records for 59 nocturnal victory claims. Mathews and Foreman also published Luftwaffe Aces — Biographies and Victory Claims, listing Schoenert with 62 claims.

Awards
 Iron Cross (1939)
 2nd Class (10 July 1941)
 1st Class (22 July 1941)
 Honour Goblet of the Luftwaffe (Ehrenpokal der Luftwaffe) on 5 January 1942
 German Cross in Gold on 18 May 1942 as Oberleutnant in the 4./Nachtjagdgeschwader 2
 Knight's Cross of the Iron Cross with Oak Leaves
 Knight's Cross on 25 July 1942 as Oberleutnant of the Reserves and Staffelkapitän of the 4./Nachtjagdgeschwader 2
 450th Oak Leaves on 11 April 1944 as Major of the Reserves and commander of Nachtjagdgruppe 10

References

Citations

Bibliography

 
 
 
 
 
 
 
 
 
 
 
 
 
 
 
 
 
 
 
 
 
 
 

1911 births
1985 deaths
People from Głogów
People from the Province of Silesia
Luftwaffe pilots
German World War II flying aces
Recipients of the Gold German Cross
Recipients of the Knight's Cross of the Iron Cross with Oak Leaves